The 1994 Scheldeprijs was the 81st edition of the Scheldeprijs cycle race and was held on 13 April 1994. The race was won by Peter Van Petegem.

General classification

References

1994
1994 in road cycling
1994 in Belgian sport
April 1994 sports events in Europe